University of the West of England Boat Club is a rowing club on the Gloucester and Sharpness Canal, based at Wycliffe College boathouse, Junction Bridge, Saul, Gloucestershire.

History
The club runs four squads  and belongs to the University of the West of England, Bristol. The club uses the boathouse owned by the Wycliffe College Boat Club.

In 2010 the club produced a national champion crew when winning the open lightweight quad sculls.

Honours

National champions

References

Sport in Gloucestershire
Rowing clubs in England